The 1992–93 Slovenian Basketball League was the second season of the Premier A Slovenian Basketball League, the highest professional basketball league in Slovenia.
The first half of the season consisted of 16 teams and 2 groups (members of SBA league were absent) began on Saturday, 5 October 1992 and ended on 2 December 1992.

Green group

P=Matches played, W=Matches won, L=Matches lost, F=Points for, A=Points against, Pts=Points

Red group

P=Matches played, W=Matches won, L=Matches lost, F=Points for, A=Points against, Pts=Points

Green group final standings

P=Matches played, W=Matches won, L=Matches lost, F=Points for, A=Points against, Pts=Points

Red group final standings

P=Matches played, W=Matches won, L=Matches lost, F=Points for, A=Points against, Pts=Points

Playoffs

External links
Official Basketball Federation of Slovenia website 

Slovenian Basketball League seasons
Slovenia
1